Jennifer Strauss  (born January 30, 1933) is a contemporary Australian poet and academic. Strauss is a recipient of the Christopher Brennan Award.

Biography
Jennifer Strauss was born in Heywood, Victoria and educated at various boarding schools and Melbourne University. Working in academia she has published several books of criticism and literary autobiography as well as editing anthologies and several volumes of her own poetry. The current president of the Australian Federation of University Women Strauss is also an Honorary Senior Research Fellow in the Department of English at Monash University.

In 2007, Strauss was appointed a Member of the Order of Australia, for her work in education, her work as an academic in the fields of literature and poetry and for her work in woman's issues and industrial relations.

Works
Poetry
Children and Other Strangers: Poems. (1975)
Winter Driving: Poems. (1981)
Labour Ward. (Pariah, 1988)
Tierra del Fuego: New and selected poems. (Pariah, 1997)

Non-fiction
Stop laughing! I'm Being Serious: Three studies in seriousness and wit in contemporary Australian poetry. (1990)
Boundary Conditions: The Poetry of Gwen Harwood. (UQP, 1992) 
Judith Wright. (OUP, 1995)

Edited
Family Ties: Australian Poems of the Family. (Oxford, 1998)
The Oxford Literary History of Australia. With Bruce Bennett (Oxford, 1999) 
The Collected Verse of Mary Gilmore: Volume 1, 1887-1929. (Australian Academy of the Humanities/UQP, 2005) review

References

External links
 ASAL Congratulates Jennifer Strauss Association for the Study of Australian Literature (Retrieved 23-July-2007) 
 
Discourse in Eden Poem
Interview

1933 births
Living people
Australian literary critics
Australian women literary critics
Academics from Melbourne
Poets from Melbourne
Members of the Order of Australia
Australian women poets